Salacoa Creek is a stream in Bartow (Old Cass County) County, in northwestern Georgia, United States, that is a tributary of the Coosawattee River. Its own tributaries include the Pine Log Creek.

The stream probably took its name from a Native American (Indian) village in the northwest part of Cherokee County.

See also

 List of rivers in Georgia (U.S. state)

References

Rivers of Cherokee County, Georgia
Rivers of Georgia (U.S. state)
Rivers of Pickens County, Georgia
Rivers of Bartow County, Georgia
Rivers of Gordon County, Georgia